HD 156279 is a type K0 star, located  away from Earth. It has various alternate designations, including HIP 84171 and BD+63 1335. It is presumed to be a single star, as in 2019 all imaging surveys have failed to find any stellar companions.

Characteristics
It has a metallicity of 0.14 and an effective temperature of 5453 Kelvin. HD 156279 is 4 billion years old and based on the spectral type, K0, it is an orange colour. HD 156279 has an apparent magnitude of 8.167 and an absolute magnitude of 5.27. The star is slightly enriched in heavy elements, having 140% of the solar abundance.

Planetary system
Orbiting HD 156279 are two superjovian planets, the inner HD 156279 b (discovered in 2011) and outer HD 156279 c (discovered in 2016). In 2022, the inclination and true mass of HD 156279 c were measured via astrometry.

References

156279
K-type main-sequence stars
084171
Planetary systems with two confirmed planets
J17122319+6321074
Durchmusterung objects
Draco (constellation)